Aleksandar Šujdović (born 1 February, 1980) is a Serbian former footballer. His career spanned 16 years across different countries throughout Europe, as well as in the Middle East and South Asia.

See also
Football in Serbia

References

1980 births
Living people
Sportspeople from Kragujevac
Serbian footballers
FC Sopron players
Serbian expatriate footballers
Expatriate footballers in Greece
Al-Nasr SC (Salalah) players
Oman Professional League players
I-League players
Expatriate footballers in India
Hindustan Aeronautics Limited S.C. players
Association football forwards